Endraavathu Oru Naal is a 2021 Tamil language drama film directed by Vetri Duraisamy and starring Vidharth and Remya Nambeesan in the lead roles. Produced by The Theatre People, it was released on 8 October 2021.

Cast 
Vidharth as Thangamuthu
Remya Nambeesan as Rasathi
Master Raghavan as Murugan
Ilavarasu
Diana Vishalini
Rajesh Balachandiran
R. Bhaskar
Mahesh Shanmugasundram

Production 
The film marked the directorial debut of Vetri Duraisamy, the son of former Mayor of Chennai Saidai Duraisamy, and production began in late 2020. The film was shot in Vellakoil near Coimbatore. Prior to release, the film had a festival run, winning 43 awards across various film festivals.

Soundtrack 
Soundtrack was composed by NR Raghunanthan.
Kanne En – Vijay Yesudas, Saindhavi
Maattu Mani Satham – Namitha Babu

Release 
The film was to have a direct television premiere on Zee Tamil on 3 October 2021. but instead released on the ZEE5 streaming platform on 8 October. A critic from The Times of India gave the film a mixed review noting "despite its less than two-hour running time, the film feels too long, like a 45-minute short film stretched to feature length". A reviewer from Cinema Express, wrote "good intentions alone don’t make a film", adding "Remya and Raghavan deliver one of their better performances, but there is only so much that actors can do when the writing is shallow". The critic likened the story of the film to Samuthirakani's Vellai Yaanai (2021) and Raame Aandalum Raavane Aandalum (2021).

References

External links 
 

2020s Tamil-language films
2021 films
Indian drama films
ZEE5 original films